Serengeti Energy Limited (SEL), formerly called responsAbility Renewable Energy Holding (rAREH), is an independent power producer (IPP) company based in Kenya, with investments in sub-Saharan Africa. SEL specializes in renewable energy sources (primarily hydro and solar) of between 5 megawatts and 50 megawatts at various development stages, including  planning, financing , construction ,and   operations. As of June 2022, the firm has a number of operational power plants in about half a dozen countries and projects in the development stage in another one half a dozen countries. At that time, its total portfolio of power stations totaled over 300 megawatts, in generation capacity.

Location
The geographical coordinates of SEL headquarters are:1°15'51.0"S, 36°45'34.0"E (Latitude:-1.264167; Longitude:36.759444).

Overview
The firm is a renewable energy IPP, established in 2013 as rAREH. It rebranded in October 2021 as Serengeti Energy Limited. As of June 2022, it has three operating hydro plants in Uganda and another three in South Africa. One hydro plant in Rwanda and two solar farms, one in Sierra Leone and the other in Malawi, are some of the projects in the pipeline.

Ownership
The shareholders in the firm have previously included (a) German Development Bank (b) Norfund and (c) Nordic Development Fund. In 2022, during a drive to raise capital for expansion, new investors have included (1) Proparco (2) Swedfund (3) STOA, a "French impact fund specializing in infrastructure financing".

Power stations
The table below illustrates the stations owned at operated by the firm. Where the percentage ownership is known, it is indicated in the table. The list is not all inclusive .

See also
 List of power stations in Africa

References

External links
 Official Webpage

Electric power companies of Kenya
Renewable energy
Companies based in Nairobi
Energy companies established in 2013
Renewable resource companies established in 2013
2013 establishments in Kenya